The Party of Industrialists and Entrepreneurs of Ukraine is a political party in Ukraine registered in April 2000. Former Ukrainian Prime Minister Anatoliy Kinakh is one of its most noticeable members.

History
At the parliamentary elections on 30 March 2002, the party was part of the For United Ukraine alliance. Party leader Anatoliy Kinakh was First Vice Prime Minister in the first Tymoshenko Government

At the parliamentary elections on 26 March 2006, the party took part in the new Our Ukraine bloc.
At the early parliamentary elections parliamentary  on September 30, 2007, party-members participated in the elections on the Party of Regions election-list.

In the 2010 local elections the party won 1 representatives in 3 regional parliaments and 6 in the Lviv Oblast.

The party did not participate in the 2012 parliamentary elections. And again not in the 2014 Ukrainian parliamentary election.

Election results

References

External links
 Party of Industrialists and Entrepreneurs of Ukraine official site

Political parties in Ukraine